Elvis McGonagall (born Richard Smith; December 22, 1960) is a Scottish poet and stand-up comedian who is especially notable for poetry slam performances.

Biography 

McGonagall was born in Perth, Scotland, and now lives in Stroud in South West England. His stage name combines a reference to the notoriously bad poet William McGonagall with 'Elvis' "because it’s just so wrong, the wrongest name I could think of to go with McGonagall".

Poetry

Slam performances 

McGonagall first performed publicly at the UK Allcomers' Slam at the Cheltenham Literature Festival in 2003, finishing runner-up: he went on to win the slam the following year.  His career saw significant progress in 2006, in which year McGonagall won the Spokefest UK Slam Championship and the World Slam Championship at the Rotterdam Poetry International Festival.

McGonagall performs at poetry events nationwide, as well as compering at the Blue Suede Sporran Club.

Media performances 

McGonagall has regularly appeared on BBC Radio 4's Saturday Live, beginning with contributions to the premiere episode. He has appeared frequently on other BBC Radio 4 programmes, including Today, Last Word and Off the Page as well as starring in two series of his own sitcom Elvis Mcgonagall Takes A Look On The Bright Side, Radio 4 Comedy of the Week stand-up special "Full Tartan Jacket" (2021) and a documentary "My Name Is Elvis" (2021).

McGonagall has also appeared on various television programmes for a number of broadcasters. His credits include BBC One's The One Show, BBC Two's The Culture Show and Channel 4's 'Random Acts'.

Works 

Audio
Gie’ It Laldy! (2018) - Elvis McGonagall & His Resurrectors
One Man And His Doggerel - Live! (2010)

Written

 Complete & Utter Cult! (2020)
 Viva Loch Lomond! (2017)
 Mostly Dreich (2012)

References

External links
 Official website

Living people
Scottish poets
Scottish entertainers
Slam poets
Poets from Dundee
People from Dundee
1960 births